The Manufacturers’ Agents National Association (MANA) is the largest North American association of manufacturers’ reps. It was founded in 1947.

Scope and operations
MANA is a 501(c)6 not-for-profit, horizontal, industry-independent organization for reps and their principals. Its missions focus on rep and principal education and matchmaking. Activities focus on helping reps and principals launch and sustain long-term relationships. Matchmaking activities introduce reps and principals whose products and business models match to launch the interview process.

Rep associations that focus on specific industries are referred to as vertical associations. Many rep companies and principals belong to both MANA and the vertical association that supports their industry. A partial list of vertical industries follows:
Association of Independent Manufacturers’/ Representatives, Inc. 
Canadian Professional Sales Association 
Electronics Representatives Association 
Electronics Representatives Association Southern California Chapter 
Equipment Marketing & Distribution Association 
The Foodservice Group, Inc. 
Foodservice Sales & Marketing Association 
Gift and Home Trade Association 
Heavy Duty Representatives Association 
Health Industry Representatives Association 
International Housewares Representatives Association 
Industrial Manufacturers’ Representative Association 
Manufacturers’ Agents of Cincinnati 
Manufacturers’ Agents Association for the Food Service Industry 
Manufacturers’ Representatives Educational Research Foundation 
National Association General Merchandise Representatives 
National Electrical Manufacturers Representatives Association 
National Marine Representatives Association 
Professional Sales Representative Organization 
Power-Motion Technology Representatives Association 
Shoe and Accessory Travelers Association (www.shoetravelers.org)
Society of Manufacturers’ Representatives 
Wisconsin Association of Manufacturers’ Agents 
Commission People Association 
United Association Manufacturers’ Reps 
Wood Reps

MANA Staff 
Charles Cohon, President and CEO
Jack Foster, Editor, Agency Sales Magazine
Pam Hamlin, Advertising Services
Alane LaPlante, Publication/Art Director
Jerry Leth, Vice President and General Manager
Susan Strouse, Secretary/Treasurer, Accounting Manager

MANA Board of Directors  
John D. Roba
Greg Bruno
Tom Hayward, Chairman of the Board
Tim Ryder
John Sandifer
Ken McGregor
Craig Lindsay

References

External links
 

Trade associations based in the United States